The Fremont Bridge is a steel tied-arch bridge over the Willamette River located in Portland, Oregon, United States. It carries Interstate 405 and US 30 traffic between downtown and North Portland where it intersects with Interstate 5. It has the longest main span of any bridge in Oregon and is the second longest tied-arch bridge in the world (after Caiyuanba Bridge across the Yangtze River, China). The bridge was designed by Parsons, Brinckerhoff, Quade and Douglas, and built by Murphy Pacific Corporation.

The bridge has two decks carrying vehicular traffic, each with four lanes. The upper deck is signed westbound on US 30 and southbound on I-405. The lower deck is signed eastbound on US 30 and northbound on I-405.

Design and construction
Due to the public's dissatisfaction with the appearance of the Marquam Bridge, the Portland Art Commission was invited to participate in the design process of the Fremont. The improvement in visual quality resulted in a bridge that was nearly six times as expensive as the purposely economical Marquam Bridge. Designers modeled the bridge after the original 1964 Port Mann Bridge in Vancouver, British Columbia.

On October 28, 1971, while still under construction, a  crack was found on the west span of this girder that required a $5.5 million redesign and repair. The ramps and approaches are steel box girders.

After assembly it was floated on a barge the  trip to the construction site. On March 16, 1973, the  steel arch span was lifted  using 32 hydraulic jacks. At the time, it was listed in the Guinness Book of World Records as the heaviest lift ever completed.

The bridge was opened on November 15, 1973, at a final cost of $82 million (equivalent to $ million in ), most of which was financed by the Federal Highway Administration. In 1976, an American flag and an Oregon flag were added atop the structure as part of the bicentennial celebration for the United States. The flags were installed with the use of a helicopter.

Falcon nest
The Fremont Bridge was also the 26th Peregrine falcon nest site designated in Oregon in 1995 after the raptor was placed on the U.S. Threatened and Endangered Species list in 1970.

Etymology
The bridge as well as Portland's associated Fremont Street were named for John C. Fremont (1813–1890). Fremont was an early explorer of the Oregon Country. He served in the United States Army at the time as a Captain and later promoted to General. In 1856, he ran for president, but was defeated by James Buchanan.

Gallery

See also

List of bridges documented by the Historic American Engineering Record in Oregon
List of crossings of the Willamette River

References

External links

Bridges in Portland, Oregon
Bridges completed in 1973
U.S. Route 30
Bridges over the Willamette River
Historic American Engineering Record in Oregon
Tied arch bridges in the United States
Road bridges in Oregon
Bridges on the Interstate Highway System
1973 establishments in Oregon
Pearl District, Portland, Oregon
Northwest District, Portland, Oregon
Eliot, Portland, Oregon
Overlook, Portland, Oregon
Bridges of the United States Numbered Highway System
Interstate 5
Steel bridges in the United States
Girder bridges in the United States